Zahak-e Pain (also Romanized as Zaḥaḵ-e Pāyīn) is a village in Jakdan Rural District, in the Central District of Bashagard County, Hormozgan Province, Iran. According to the 2006 census, its population was 86, in 20 families.

References 

Populated places in Bashagard County